Events from the year 1895 in France.

Incumbents
President: Jean Casimir-Perier (until 15 January), Felix Faure (starting 16 January)
President of the Council of Ministers: 
 until 26 January: Charles Dupuy 
 26 January-1 November: Alexandre Ribot 
 starting 1 November: Léon Bourgeois

Events
 5 January – The military degradation of Alfred Dreyfus takes place on the Champ de Mars, Paris.
 17 January – Félix Faure is elected President of French Republic after the resignation of Jean Casimir-Perier.
 17 January – Dreyfus is moved into a military reformatory on the island of Ré.
 21 February – Dreyfus is put on board ship to be exiled.
 15 March – Dreyfus is landed on Devil's Island.
 1 October – French troops capture Antananarivo, Madagascar.

Arts and literature
 1 January – Alphonse Mucha's lithographed poster for the play Gismonda starring Sarah Bernhardt is posted in Paris. Bernhardt is so satisfied with its success that she gives Mucha a six-year contract.
 3 July – Paul Gauguin leaves France to settle permanently in Polynesia.
 27 August -Swami Vivekananda  was invited by the Paris Congress to deliver a speech on Psychic Prana
 November – Paul Cézanne has his first solo exhibition, at the Paris gallery of Ambroise Vollard.
 28 December – Auguste and Louis Lumière display the first moving picture film, in Paris.

Sport
 24 September–31 October – The Automobile Club de France sponsors the longest race to date, a  event from Bordeaux to Agen and back. Because it is held in ten stages, it can be considered the first rally. The first three places are taken by a Panhard, a Panhard, and a three-wheeler De Dion-Bouton.

Births

January to March
 29 January – Pierre Gaxotte, historian (died 1982)
 11 February – Maurice Cottenet, soccer player (died 1972)
 28 February – Marcel Pagnol, novelist, playwright, and filmmaker (died 1974)
 2 March – Marcel Carpentier, military officer (died 1977)
 16 March – Ernest Labrousse, historian (died 1988)
 20 March – Robert Benoist, motor racing driver and war hero (executed) (died 1944)
 30 March
 Père Marie-Benoît, friar who helped smuggle Jews to safety from Nazi-occupied Southern France (died 1990)
 Jean Giono, author (died 1970)

April to June
 5 April – Fernand Mourlot, printer and publisher (died 1988)
 3 May – Gabriel Chevallier, novelist (died 1969)
 4 May – René Mayer, politician and Prime Minister of France (died 1972)
 11 May – Jacques Brugnon, tennis player (died 1978)
 9 June – Henri Diamant-Berger, screenwriter, film director and producer (died 1972)
 12 June – Eugénie Brazier, cook (died 1977)

July to September
 2 July – Gen Paul, painter and engraver (died 1975)
 7 August – Alain Saint-Ogan, comics author and artist (died 1974)
 18 September – Jean Batmale, soccer player (died 1973)

October to December
 9 October – René Lasserre, rugby union player (died 1965)
 3 November – Pierre Richard-Willm, actor (died 1983)
 5 November – Walter Gieseking, pianist and composer (died 1956)
 20 November
 Pierre Cot, politician (died 1977)
 Germain Jousse, member of the French Resistance (died 1988)
 25 November – Adrienne Bolland, test pilot and first woman to fly over the Andes (died 1975)
 27 November – Pierre-Paul Grassé, zoologist (died 1985)
 29 November – Edgard de Larminat, General (died 1962)
 9 December – Marguerite Huré, stained glass artist (died 1967)
 14 December – Paul Éluard, poet (died 1952)

Full date unknown
 Albert Gilles, copper craftsman (died 1979)

Deaths

January to June
 10 January – Benjamin Godard, violinist and  composer (born 1849)
 28 January – François Certain de Canrobert, Marshal of France (born 1809)
 29 January – Charles Frédéric Girard, biologist (born 1822)
 16 February – André Garin, missionary and parish priest (born 1822)
 19 February – Auguste Vacquerie, journalist and man of letters (born 1819)
 11 March – Louis-Florentin Calmeil, psychiatrist and medical historian (born 1798)
 22 April – Étienne Léopold Trouvelot, artist, astronomer and amateur entomologist, introduced the gypsy moth into North America (born 1827)
 11 May – Auguste-Théodore-Paul de Broglie, professor of apologetics (born 1834)
 22 May – Claude Marie Dubuis, second Roman Catholic bishop of Texas (born 1817)
 28 May – Alexandre Martin, socialist statesman (born 1815)

July to December
 19 July – Henri Ernest Baillon, botanist and physician (born 1827)
 16 August – Mathieu Auguste Geffroy, historian (born 1820)
 28 September – Louis Pasteur, chemist and microbiologist (born 1822)
 24 November – Jules Barthélemy-Saint-Hilaire, philosopher, journalist and statesman (born 1805)
 27 November – Alexandre Dumas, fils, writer, author and playwright (born 1824)
 11 December – Jean-Baptiste Joseph Émile Montégut, critic (born 1825)
 31 December – Père Jean Marie Delavay, missionary, explorer and botanist (born 1834)

See also
 List of French films before 1910

References

1890s in France